Brignole may refer to:

Angelo Brignole (1924–2006), Italian racing cyclist
Dario Brignole (born 1968), sports and broadcasting agent based in the United States of America
Giacomo Luigi Brignole (1797–1853), Catholic Cardinal and Camerlengo of the Sacred College of Cardinals
Giacomo Maria Brignole (1724–1801), the 176th and 184th Doge of the Republic of Genoa
Giuseppe Brignole (1703–1769), Genoese nobleman and father of Maria Caterina Brignole, Princess of Monaco
Maria Caterina Brignole (1737–1813), Princess consort of Monaco by marriage to Honoré III, Prince of Monaco
Maria Brignole Sale De Ferrari, Duchess of Galliera (1811–1888), Italian noblewoman and philanthropist
Anna Pieri Brignole Sale (1765–1815), Sienese noble and court official

See also
Genova Brignole railway station, the second largest station of Genoa, northern Italy
Brignole (Genoa Metro), metro station on the line 1 at Genoa
Brignola
Brignoles
Brignoli
Brignolia

de:Brignole
es:Brignole
fr:Brignole
it:Brignole
nl:Brignole